Carlo Pavesi (10 June 1923 – 24 March 1995) was an Italian fencer. He won four gold medals in total at the 1952, 1956 and 1960 Olympics in the individual and team épée events.

References

1923 births
1995 deaths
Italian male fencers
Olympic fencers of Italy
Fencers at the 1952 Summer Olympics
Fencers at the 1956 Summer Olympics
Fencers at the 1960 Summer Olympics
Olympic gold medalists for Italy
Olympic medalists in fencing
Medalists at the 1952 Summer Olympics
Medalists at the 1956 Summer Olympics
Medalists at the 1960 Summer Olympics
Mediterranean Games silver medalists for Italy
Mediterranean Games medalists in fencing
Fencers at the 1951 Mediterranean Games